William, Willie, Will or Bill Pope may refer to:
 William Pope, 1st Earl of Downe (1573–1631)
 William Pope (naturalist) (1811–1903), English-born naturalist and painter
 William Burt Pope (1822–1903), English Christian theologian
 William Henry Pope (Canadian politician) (1825–1879), Canadian lawyer, politician and judge
 William Henry Pope (U.S. politician) (1847–1913), Texas state senator
 William Hayes Pope (1870–1916), U.S. federal judge
 William Jackson Pope (1870–1939), English chemist
 Willie Pope (1918–2010), American baseball player
 J. William Pope (1938–2014), member of the Tennessee House of Representatives
 Bill Pope (born 1952), American cinematographer
 William Pope.L (born 1955), American performance artist
 William Kenneth Pope (died 1989), bishop of the Methodist Church
 Will Pope, fictional character in TNT's The Closer